Arundel is a suburb in the City of Gold Coast, Queensland, Australia.

Geography
Located in the suburb is the Coombabah Lake Conservation Park, bordered by Coombabah Creek and adjacent to the Ivan Gibbs Wetlands Reserve in Coombabah.  The Biggera Creek Dam is located in Arundel, for the purpose of flood mitigation.

History
In September 1989, Arundel was officially named a suburb and has since grown into a series of housing estates.

A.B. Paterson College opened on 1 January 1991. In 2016, A.B. Paterson College celebrated its 25th anniversary.

Arundel State School opened on 1 January 1994.

The median age of the Arundel population was 36 years, 1 year below the national median of 37.  60.9% of people living in Arundel were born in Australia. The other top responses for country of birth were New Zealand 9.7%, England 5.5%, China 1.3%, South Africa 1.2%, Korea, Republic of 1.2%.  80% of people spoke only English at home; the next most common languages were 1.6% Korean, 1.5% Mandarin, 1.2% Japanese, 0.8% Cantonese, 0.5% Greek.

Heritage listings 
There are a number of heritage-listed sites in Arundel, including:

 120 - 124 Allied Drive: former Burleigh Police Station, former Tallebudgera Police Station, Nui Dat House

Education 
Arundel State School is a government primary (Prep-6) school for boys and girls at Cnr Napper Road & Arundel Drive. In 2018, the school had an enrolment of 1125 students with 78 teachers (72 full-time equivalent) and 40 non-teaching staff (28 full-time equivalent). It includes a special education program.

A B Paterson College is a private primary and secondary (Prep-12) school for boys and girls at 10 A B Paterson Drive. In 2018, the school had an enrolment of 1390 students with 103 teachers and 90 non-teaching staff (72 full-time equivalent).

There is no government secondary school in Arundel. The nearest government secondary schools are Coombabah State High School in neighbouring Coombabah to the north, Southport State High School in neighbouring Southport to the south-east, and Pacific Pines State High School in Pacific Pines to the west.

Amenities
Situated nearby is the Arundel Hills Country Club, which has its own golf course.  Other major facilities are located in adjacent suburbs, including Helensvale railway station and Westfield Helensvale (Helensvale), Harbour Town Shopping Centre (Biggera Waters) and Griffith University, Gold Coast University Hospital and the G:link light rail service.

See also

 List of Gold Coast suburbs

References

Sources

External links

 

Suburbs of the Gold Coast, Queensland